Sesquicentennial State Park is a state park in the Sandhills region of South Carolina. Known to locals as Sesqui,(), the park was built by the Civilian Conservation Corps during the Great Depression and was donated to the City of Columbia by the Sesquicentennial Commission in 1937.

This park has three picnic shelters, four picnic pads, and 84 campsites that vary in amenities & sizes. The Sandhills Trail is an ADA-accessible  loop around the park lake. Sesqui is the only South Carolina State Park that offers a full-scale splash pad and a membership-only dog park that allows dogs to run off-leash.

History 
The park was donated to the City of Columbia by the Sesquicentennial Commission in 1937 to mark the 150th anniversary of the city's founding as the state’s second capital. Many of the buildings in the park, as well as the stone entrance to the park, were built by members of the Civilian Conservation Corps.

References

External links 
 Park Finder site
 SCIway site

State parks of South Carolina
Protected areas of Richland County, South Carolina
Geography of Columbia, South Carolina
Dog parks in the United States
Civilian Conservation Corps in South Carolina
Tourist attractions in Columbia, South Carolina
Protected areas established in 1937
1937 establishments in South Carolina